Kennebunk  is a town in York County, Maine, United States. The population was 11,536 at the 2020 census (the population does not include Kennebunkport, a separate town). Kennebunk is home to several beaches, the Rachel Carson National Wildlife Refuge, the 1799 Kennebunk Inn, many historic shipbuilders' homes, the Brick Store Museum and the Nature Conservancy Kennebunk Plains (known locally as the Blueberry Plains), with 1,500 acres (6 km) of nature trails and blueberry fields. The municipality includes the constituent villages of Kennebunk Village (Town), the Lower Village (Lower Kennebunk), Kennebunk Landing (the Landing), Bartlett Mills, West Kennebunk, Kennebunk Beach, Lords Point, Coopers Corner Crossing, Sea Roads Crossing, Webahennet Grove, and Vinegarhill, Cheshire Commons, Kennebunk Meadows, and various newer neighborhoods.

History

First settled in 1621, the town developed as a trading and, later, shipbuilding and shipping center with light manufacturing. It was part of the town of Wells and Arundel until 1820, when it incorporated as a separate town. "Kennebunk, the only village in the world so named," was featured on a large locally famous sign attached to the Kesslen Shoe Mill on Route One. To the Abenaki peoples, Kennebunk means "the long cut bank," presumably the long bank behind Kennebunk Beach. Kennebunk's coastline is divided into three major sections: Mother's Beach; Middle Beach or Rocky Beach; and Gooch's Beach or Long Beach. Separate from Kennebunk Beach is secluded Parson's Beach, a quiet alternative to the summer crowds. Note there is some local controversy regarding the "Mother's Beach" moniker, (nickname). According to many local residents, the smaller of the three main beaches—at the intersection of Beach Ave and Ridge Ave—is officially Kennebunk Beach or, alternatively, Boothby Beach. The term Boothby beach was from the mid-1730s when a Mabel Littlefield married Richard Boothby and settled on land near what came to be known as Boothby Beach. The information about the Boothbys was taken from "Old News From Southern Maine" article on Mable and Richard Boothby, by Sharon Cummins. Many natives today may not remember it being called Boothby Beach and over the years the beach came to be known as Kennebunk Beach or Mothers Beach. Older residents also recall the name Dipsy Bath Beach, a reference to the baths once located there.  The term Mother's Beach didn't come into widespread use until the mid 1980s; Although other native residents will dispute that date and say they remember it being called "Mothers Beach" as far back as the late 1950s. The name likely evolved due to its small size and generally calmer water, due to the rocks under and above the ocean, thus making it a natural made harbor of refuge that is safer for swimming and which makes it popular with mothers keeping a watchful eye on their progeny, (children).  The name is clearly descriptive rather than official, in spite of the recent installation of road signs pointing the way to "Mother's Beach". Contradicting the above beach naming is the Town's website listing "Permits are valid for Gooch’s Beach, Kennebunk Beach (Middle Beach) and Mother’s Beach." Additionally without public parking access both Libbys and Crescent beaches are in Kennebunk between Parson's beach and Mother's beach.

In the 19th century and early 20th century, many industrial concerns were attracted to Mousam River at Kennebunk to provide motive force for their mills. Among the firms to do business there were the Kennebunk Manufacturing Company, the Mousam Manufacturing  Company, the Leatheroid Company and the Rogers Fibre Company.

The town is a popular summer tourist destination. Kennebunk contains fine examples of early architecture, the most noted of which is the Wedding Cake House, a Federal-style dwelling extensively decorated with scroll saw Gothic trim. This was added to the house for his wife of many years by George Washington Bourne late in his life, and not as legend has it by a ship captain for a young bride lost at sea. Local economy is tourism based. The headquarters for the natural health-care product manufacturer Tom's of Maine is located in Kennebunk. The town's archives are located at the local history and art center, the Brick Store Museum, on Main Street. Many residents commute to Portland, New Hampshire, and Massachusetts.

The Lafayette Elm was a tree which was planted to commemorate General Lafayette's 1825 visit to Kennebunk. It became famous for its age, size, and survival of the Dutch elm disease that destroyed the hundreds of the other elms that once lined Kennebunk's streets. The elm is featured on the town seal. The restored Kesslen Shoe Mill has been renamed the Lafayette Center. Kennebunk is home to two of the state's oldest banks—Ocean Bank (1854) and Kennebunk Savings Bank (1871). Only Saco & Biddeford Savings Institution (1827) and Bangor Savings Bank (1852) are older. Summer Street was Maine's first Historic District that was listed on the National Register of Historic Places.

Geography

Kennebunk is drained by the Kennebunk River and Mousam River.

Transportation links are:
 Interstate 95
 U.S. 1 which goes through the center of Kennebunk and is part of the main street.
 Route 9A
 Route 35
Amtrak also goes through Kennebunk, but does not have a station stop. The closest Amtrak station to Kennebunk is in Wells, towards Boston, and Saco, towards Portland.

Adjacent municipalities
 Arundel, Maine (north)
 Kennebunkport, Maine (north)
 Wells, Maine (south)
 Sanford, Maine (west)
 Alfred, Maine (west)
 Lyman, Maine (northwest)

Demographics

2010 census

As of the census of 2010, there were 10,798 people, 4,689 households, and 2,966 families living in the town. The racial makeup of the town was 96.9% White, 0.00% African American, 0.2% Native American, 1.0% Asian, 0.3% from other races, and 1.1% from two or more races. Hispanic or Latino of any race were 1.0% of the population.

There were 4,689 households, of which 26.9% had children under the age of 18 living with them, 52.1% were married couples living together, 8.5% had a female householder with no husband present, 2.7% had a male householder with no wife present, and 36.7% were non-families. 31.1% of all households were made up of individuals, and 16.5% had someone living alone who was 65 years of age or older. The average household size was 2.27 and the average family size was 2.85.

The median age in the town was 48.2 years. 20.8% of residents were under the age of 18; 5.2% were between the ages of 18 and 24; 18.7% were from 25 to 44; 33.4% were from 45 to 64, and 21.9% were 65 years of age or older. The gender makeup of the town was 46.5% male and 53.5% female.

2000 census

At the 2000 census, there were 10,476 people, 4,229 households and 2,901 families living in the town. The racial makeup of the town was 98.04% White, 0.18% Black or African American, 0.11% Native American, 0.85% Asian, 0.01% Pacific Islander, 0.18% from other races, and 0.62% from two or more races. Hispanic or Latino of any race were 0.51% of the population.

There were 4,229 households, of which 33.2% had children under the age of 18 living with them, 56.9% were married couples living together, 9.1% had a female householder with no husband present, and 31.4% were non-families. 26.7% of all households were made up of individuals, and 13.8% had someone living alone who was 65 years of age or older. The average household size was 2.44 and the average family size was 2.97.

Age distribution was 25.6% under the age of 18, 4.2% from 18 to 24, 27.3% from 25 to 44, 25.8% from 45 to 64, and 17.2% who were 65 years of age or older. The median age was 41 years. For every 100 females, there were 87.2 males. For every 100 females age 18 and over, there were 82.1 males.

The median household income was $50,914, and the median family income was $59,712. Males had a median income of $42,417 versus $25,788 for females. The per capita income for the town was $26,181. About 2.9% of families and 4.2% of the population were below the poverty line, including 3.3% of those under age 18 and 3.5% of those aged 65 or over.

Sites of interest
 Brick Store Museum
 Wedding Cake House

Education
Kennebunk, along with neighboring Kennebunkport and Arundel, form Regional School District 21. The schools in RSU 21 are Consolidated School, Kennebunk Elementary School, Mildred L. Day School, Sea Road School, Middle School of the Kennebunks, and Kennebunk High School. The Middle School of the Kennebunks is part of Maine's project that gives laptops to all of the 6th, 7th and 8th graders in the school called MLTI, or Maine Learning Technology Initiative.

In 2000, a group of students teamed up with parents and local community members to found The New School, a small alternative high school, with students coming from as close as Kennebunk and Wells and as far away as Portland and Somersworth. The school is accredited by the State of Maine and the first group of students graduated in June 2001. The New School has a focus on community-based learning.

Notable people 

 Kate Chappell, businesswoman
 Tom Chappell, businessman
 Eunice Hale Waite Cobb, writer, public speaker, activist
 Jack Coombs, baseball player who grew up in Kennebunk
 Joseph Dane, US congressman
 Turney Duff, author and businessperson
 Judith Hunt, illustrator
 Hugh McCulloch, secretary of the U.S. Treasury
 Brooke McEldowney, cartoonist
 Bruce McMillan, children's book author, photo-illustrator, and watercolor artist
 Thomas W. Murphy Jr., eight-term State Representative and chair of the Maine Republican Party
 Edmund S. Muskie, U.S. Senator and 58th U.S. Secretary of State, summer resident of Kennebunk Beach
 Erik Nedeau, runner
 Jeff Olson, musician
 Kenneth Roberts, author
 Clement Storer, US congressman and senator
 Pinkerton Thugs, musicians
 Mary Alice Willcox, zoologist

References

External links
 "Kennebunk, Maine History" (1996) by Joyce Butler at University of Maine, Maine Town Documents. 394.)
 Town of Kennebunk, Maine
 Kennebunk Free Library
 MSAD 71
 The New School
 History and old maps of Kennebunk Maine
 City Data Profile
 Epodunk Town Profile
 Kennebunk Images
 Maine Genealogy: Kennebunk, York County, Maine

 
Populated places established in 1620
Portland metropolitan area, Maine
Towns in York County, Maine
Towns in Maine
Populated coastal places in Maine
1620 establishments in the Thirteen Colonies